The 13th IAAF World Half Marathon Championships was held on 3 October 2004 in New Delhi, India. A total of 152 athletes, 91 men and 61 women, from 55 countries took part.

Detailed reports on the event and an appraisal of the results were given both
for the men's race and for the women's race.

Complete results were published for the men's race, for the women's race, for men's team, and for women's team.

The competition also incorporated the 1st Asian Half Marathon Championships. Abdullah Ahmed Hassan of Qatar and Sun Yingjie of China were the inaugural winners. The tournament has not been held since, however.

Medallists

Race results

Men's

Women's

Team results

Men's

Women's

Participation
The participation of 152 athletes (91 men/61 women) from 55 countries is reported.

 (1)
 (1)
 (2)
 (3)
 (2)
 (1)
 (3)
 (1)
 (2)
 (1)
 (1)
 (1)
 (4)
 (8)
 (8)
 (1)
 (1)
 (10)
 (1)
 (1)
 (4)
 (8)
 (1)
 (3)
 (6)
 (2)
 (2)
 (1)
 (1)
 (1)
 (2)
 (1)
 (6)
 (1)
 (4)
 (1)
 (1)
 (1)
 (1)
 (3)
 (4)
 (9)
 (1)
 (1)
 (1)
 (5)
 (3)
 (1)
 (4)
 (2)
 (2)
 (5)
 (9)
 (1)
 (1)

Asian Championships

See also
2004 in athletics (track and field)

References

External links
Official website

Half Marathon Championships
Half Marathon Championships
World Athletics Half Marathon Championships
International athletics competitions hosted by India